Penney OpCo LLC, doing business as JCPenney and often abbreviated JCP, is an American department store chain operating 667 stores across 49 U.S. states and Puerto Rico. Departments inside JCPenney stores include Mens, Womens, Boys, Girls, Baby, Bedding, Home, Fine Jewelry, Shoes, Lingerie, The Salon by InStyle, JCPenney Beauty, as well as leased departments such as Seattle's Best Coffee, US Vision optical centers, and Lifetouch portrait studios.

Most JCPenney stores were initially located in downtown areas, but, as shopping malls grew in popularity during the 1960s, the chain began relocating and developing stores to anchor the malls. In recent years, JCP has opened stores in power centers, as well as stand-alone stores, sometimes adjacent to competitors. The company has been an Internet retailer since 1998, and it has streamlined its catalog and distribution while undergoing renovation improvements at store level.

In May 2020, JCPenney filed for Chapter 11 bankruptcy protection and, in September 2020, Brookfield Asset Management and Simon Property Group agreed to purchase the company for around $800 million in cash and debt. The deal was approved by the U.S. bankruptcy court for the Southern District of Texas two months later.

In May 2022, the company announced that it was returning to its Plano headquarters.

20th century

Background and early history 

James Cash Penney was born in Hamilton, Missouri. After graduating from high school, Penney worked for a local retailer. He relocated to Colorado at the advice of a doctor, hoping that a better climate would improve his health. In 1898, Penney went to work for Thomas Callahan and Guy Johnson, who owned dry goods stores called Golden Rule stores in Colorado and Wyoming. In 1899, Callahan sent Penney to Evanston, Wyoming, to work with Johnson in another Golden Rule store. Callahan and Johnson asked Penney to join them in opening a new Golden Rule store. Using money from savings and a loan, Penney joined the partnership and moved with his wife and infant son to Kemmerer, Wyoming, to start his own store. Penney opened the store on April 14, 1902. He participated in the creation of two more stores and purchased full interest in all three locations when Callahan and Johnson dissolved their partnership in 1907. In 1909, Penney moved his company headquarters to Salt Lake City, Utah to be closer to banks and railroads. By 1912, Penney had 34 stores in the Rocky Mountain States. In 1913, all stores were consolidated under the J. C. Penney banner. The so-called "mother store", in Kemmerer, opened as the chain's second location in 1904. It still operates, as of 2018, albeit with shorter hours than many other locations, and is closed on Sundays.

In 1913, the company was incorporated under the new name, J. C. Penney Company, with William Henry McManus as a co-founder. In 1914, the headquarters was moved to New York City to simplify buying, financing, and transportation of goods. By 1917, the company operated 175 stores in 22 states in the United States. J. C. Penney acquired The Crescent Corset Company in 1920, the company's first wholly owned subsidiary. In 1922, the company's oldest active private brand, Big Mac work clothes, was launched. The company opened its 500th store in 1924 in Hamilton, Missouri, James Cash Penney's hometown. By the opening of the 1,000th store in 1928, gross business had reached $190 million (equivalent to $ in ).

In 1940, Sam Walton began working at a J. C. Penney in Des Moines, Iowa. Walton later founded retailer Walmart in 1962. By 1941, J. C. Penney operated 1,600 stores in all 48 states. In 1956, J. C. Penney started national advertising with a series of advertisements in Life magazine. J. C. Penney credit cards were first issued in 1959.

Full-line department store 
The company dedicated its first full-line shopping-center department store in 1961. This store was located at Black Horse Pike Center in Audubon, New Jersey. The second full-line shopping center store was dedicated, at King of Prussia Plaza in King of Prussia, Pennsylvania in late 1962. Those stores expanded the lines of merchandise and services that an average J. C. Penney carried to include appliances, sporting goods, tools, garden\lawn merchandise, restaurants, beauty salons, portrait studios, auto parts, and auto centers.

In 1962, J. C. Penney entered discount merchandising with the acquisition of General Merchandise Company which gave them The Treasury stores. These discount operations proved unsuccessful and were shuttered in 1981. In 1963, J. C. Penney issued its first catalog. The company operated in-store catalog desks in eight states. The catalogs were distributed by the Milwaukee Catalog distribution center.

In 1969, the company acquired Thrift Drug, a chain of drugstores headquartered in Pittsburgh, Pennsylvania. It also acquired Supermarkets Interstate, an Omaha-based food retailer which operated leased departments in J. C. Penney stores, The Treasury stores, and Thrift Drug stores.

Expansion beyond the contiguous US 
In the 1960s, JCPenney expanded to include Alaska, Hawaii, and Puerto Rico. Stores were opened in Anchorage and Fairbanks, Alaska in 1962, followed by Honolulu, Hawaii in 1966, and Puerto Rico in 1968. The Penney Building in Anchorage partially collapsed and was damaged beyond repair in the 1964 Alaska earthquake. The company rebuilt the store as a shorter building on a larger footprint and followed up by building Anchorage's first public parking garage, which opened in 1968. The Honolulu store was located at Ala Moana Center, and closed in 2003, along with all remaining locations in the state, making Hawaii the only U.S. state to not currently have a JCPenney store. It was the largest J. C. Penney until a  store was dedicated at Greater Chicago's Woodfield Mall in 1971.

1970s and the death of J.C. Penney 
On February 12, 1971, James Cash Penney died at the age of 95; the company's stores were closed the morning of his funeral on February 16. That year, the company adopted the JCPenney style in advertising. and its revenues reached $5 billion (equivalent to $ in ) for the first time and catalog business made a profit for the first time.

JCPenney reached its peak number of stores in 1973, with 2,053 stores, 300 of which were full-line establishments. However, the company was hard hit by the 1974 recession with its stock price declining by two-thirds. In 1977, J. C. Penney sold its stores in Italy to La Rinascente and also removed its Supermarkets Interstate leased departments. In 1980, the company closed the unprofitable Treasury discount stores to focus resources on its core retail stores. In 1978, the J. C. Penney Historic District in Kemmerer, Wyoming, was designated a U.S. National Historic Landmark. In 1979, JCPenney stores started accepting Visa cards. MasterCard was accepted the following year.

1980s 
In 1983, JCPenney discontinued its appliance, hardware, outdoor equipment, and auto center departments, and also sold its automotive centers to Firestone. Also in 1983, it began selling goods online through the Viewtron videotex service. That same year, fashion designer Roy Halston, signed a six-year, $1 billion deal with JCPenney to sell a line of affordable clothing, accessories, cosmetics, and perfumes ranging in price from $24 to $200. The move was considered controversial then as no other high-end designer up to that point in time had licensed their designs to a mid-price retailer. The line, named Halston III, would not last long, as it would be poorly received and discontinued after about a year. However, the business move paved the way for other such high-end designers to sell their products at stores of varying price ranges in the future. 

In 1984, JCPenney acquired the First National Bank of Harrington, Delaware and renamed it J. C. Penney National Bank. With the acquisition of the bank, the company became able to issue its own Mastercard and Visa Inc. cards. The company also began accepting American Express cards. Also that year, Thrift Drug began co-locating stores with Weis Markets, and acquired many former Pantry Pride properties. In April 1987, the company announced that it was moving its headquarters to Plano, Texas. After several years of development, the JCPenney Television Shopping Channel appeared on cable systems beginning in 1989. By the mid-1980s, all JCPenney stores had discontinued sales of firearms. Before this point, JCPenney carried rifles and shotguns branded as JCPenney but produced by numerous established firearms manufacturers. In the 1980s JCPenney's also stopped selling outdoor equipment and hardware such as lawn mowers and tools.

1990s 

The company headquarters in Plano, Texas broke ground in 1990 and was completed in 1992. When Sears closed its catalog business in 1993, J. C. Penney became the largest catalog retailer in the United States. In 1996, the company expanded its drug store business with the acquisition of Fay's Drug and Kerr Drug. These acquisitions momentum climaxed with the acquisition of the Eckerd chain in November. Fay's, Kerr, and Eckerd merged into J. C. Penney's drug store subsidiary Thrift Drug. Fay's, most Kerr, and Thrift drug stores were re-branded Eckerd in 1997. (Kerr Drug stores in The Carolinas remained branded as such because they were part of a group of stores that were divested because of trade competition issues raised during the merger.) On December 9, 1998, The New York Times reported JCPenney would acquire controlling interest of Lojas Renner for a little over $33 million, which increased the company's maneuvering ability with their already existing units in Chile, Mexico and Puerto Rico. In 1998, JCPenney launched its Internet store.

Between 1995 and 1998, JCPenney entered Indonesia under partnership with Lippo Group (under their Multipolar investment arm) with the branding JCPenney Collections, also used by multiple international JCPenney branches across Asia during the decade. This type of JCPenney store only featured fashion for men, women and kids. During its tenure, JCPenney opened two flagship stores: in 1995 on the upper ground level of Lippo Supermal (now Supermal Karawaci), and in 1996 on the upper ground and first level of Mal Taman Anggrek. Aside from the two, JCPenney also opened smaller stores under the JCPenney Collections name in a few malls such as Plaza Blok M. All stores of JCPenney Collections in Indonesia started planning to close down due to 1997 Asian financial crisis – with the JCPenney Collections store in Taman Anggrek closed in December 1997, and the May 1998 riots – with the Lippo Supermal store looted by mass and also exiting the mall that same month (having to close down for a period of time due to damage caused by arson in other sections of the mall). Currently, the previous stores are occupied by H&M at Supermal Karawaci and Matahari Department Store at Mal Taman Anggrek respectively.

21st century

2000s 

In early 2001, J. C. Penney closed 44 under-performing stores. In 2001, J. C. Penney sold its direct-marketing insurance unit to Dutch insurer Aegon for $1.3 billion (equivalent to $ in ) in cash to help refocus the company on retail. In 2003, the company opened three stores in strip centers in Texas, Minnesota and Indiana. The new one-level,  format stores focus on convenience with wider aisles and centralized checkouts. In 2004, the company added 14 more stores and exited the drug store division after 35 years, with the sale of its Eckerd division. The company also sold its six Mexico stores to Grupo Carso, which rebranded five of the stores as Dorian's and the other one as Sears Mexico. In 2005, J. C. Penney's e-commerce storefront exceeded the one billion dollar revenue mark for the first time.At the same time in June, the company would sell off its shares of Lojas Renner, the Brazilian-based retailer. Generating $260 million from the sale as it discontinues its operations with Renner and its Latin American footholds as well. 

In 2007, J. C. Penney launched the Ambrielle lingerie label, which became its largest private brand launched in the company's history. J. C. Penney also re-introduced cosmetics with the opening of Sephora "stores-within-a-store" inside some J. C. Penney locations. Beginning in 2007, J. C. Penney's store slogan changed from "It's All Inside" to "Every Day Matters." The new slogan and associated ad campaign was launched in television commercials during the 79th Academy Awards in late February 2007. After J. C. Penney sold off Eckerd in 2004, the locations that continued to operate as Eckerd (some locations in the Southern U.S. were sold to CVS Corporation) still had J. C. Penney Catalog Centers inside the stores (which was a carryover from locations that were once Thrift Drug) and also continued to accept J. C. Penney credit cards. After Rite Aid finalized its acquisition of Eckerd in 2007, the Catalog Centers inside the soon-to-be-converted stores permanently closed. Although as a result of the acquisition, Rite Aid now accepts J. C. Penney credit cards, even at Rite Aid locations that existed before the acquisition of Eckerd. In November 2007, the company launched a new public website, JCPenneyBrands.com, which covers the company's private and exclusive brands and its branding strategy, as well as a preview of an upcoming product line.

In February 2008, the company launched the "American Living" brand, as developed by Ralph Lauren, across several product lines. The launch, which was accompanied by an ad campaign during the 80th Academy Awards, was the company's largest private brand launch. That summer, J. C. Penney also added a new brand to its home collection, "Linden Street." The Linden Street brand features furniture, domestics, and home decor. Linden Street is sold exclusively in J. C. Penney stores and through its website. Other brands for juniors and young men's were launched that summer. They included a relaunch of Le Tigre, along with Decree, and Fabulosity, a junior line of clothing by Kimora Lee Simmons.

In July 2009, new additions were made to the J. C. Penney young men's department, including an expansion of its private brand Decree (previously exclusively a juniors clothing line) and the introduction of more skate/surf-oriented clothing, including Rusty, RS by Ryan Sheckler and 3rd Rail. In August, Albert Gonzalez's defense lawyer announced JCPenney was a victim of a computer hacker, although the company stated that no customers' credit card information had been stolen. That year, J. C. Penney reached an agreement with Seattle's Best Coffee to feature full-service cafes within leased departments inside J. C. Penney stores across the country. Currently, Seattle's Best Coffee is still expanding café locations within J. C. Penney locations across the country.

2010–2014

In September 2010, J. C. Penney joined Facebook to help promote its "Care, Share, Win" campaign. Since 1999, J. C. Penney has donated $100 million to after-school care. That fall, Vornado Realty Trust took a 9.9 percent stake in Penney; it sold off its 9.9 Million share interest in the company for $13.00 per share in 2013.

On January 24, 2011, J. C. Penney announced it would exit the catalog business and close all 19 of its catalog outlet stores. An additional seven stores, two call center facilities, and one customer decorating facility would also be closed. One of the J. C. Penney Outlet Stores that closed, at Franklin Mills Mall in Philadelphia, was replaced on March 2, 2012, by a regular J. C. Penney store, which later closed in 2017. On February 12, 2011, The New York Times exposed the company's use of link schemes—"spamdexing"—to increase the J. C. Penney website's ranking in Google search results, especially during the holiday season. Doug Pierce, an expert in online search from Blue Fountain Media, described the optimization as "the most ambitious attempt to game Google's search results that he has ever seen". Ultimately, Google took retaliatory action and drastically reduced the visibility of J. C. Penney in the search results. Although the retailer denied any involvement, it fired its search engine consulting firm, SearchDex.

In June 2011, J. C. Penney announced that Ron Johnson, who had led Apple retail stores in a period of high growth, became the company's new CEO. In October 2011, J. C. Penney sold the 15 remaining catalog outlet stores to SB Capital Group.  The stores would remain open as they transitioned to JC's 5 Star Outlets. On December 7, J. C. Penney announced the acquisition of 16.6 percent of Martha Stewart Living Omnimedia stock. J. C. Penney planned to put "mini-Martha Stewart shops" in many of its stores in 2013, as well as create a website together.

In January 2012, the company's chief operating officer at the time, Michael Kramer, revealed to The Wall Street Journal that more than 30 percent of the bandwidth of J. C. Penney's headquarters was used for the viewing of YouTube videos during that month alone. Kramer consequently laid off 1,600 employees to change the company's workplace culture. On February 1, J. C. Penney began a new pricing method, with "Every Day" prices on most days reflecting what used to be sale prices, "Monthly Value" for certain items every month in place of sales, and "Best Price" the first and third Fridays of each month, tied to paydays. Prices would also not end in 9 or 7 and would instead use whole figures to price items. The changes in the stores include a focus on the mini-stores such as those for Martha Stewart products.

In April 2012, the company announced plans to trim its workforce, laying off nearly 13% of its home office staff in Dallas, and closing a call center in Pittsburgh. Many managers, supervisors, and long-time employees were let go on April 30, 2012. In June, the company announced that Michael Francis, the company's president, was leaving the company, after only eight months on the job, effective immediately. In July 2012, the company announced that it was laying off 350 more workers at its headquarters. In August, J. C. Penney began rolling out a store-within-a-store strategy, with plans to eventually roll out 100 shops in 683 stores. That month, the company posted a second-quarter comparable-store loss of 22%, with internet sales dropping 33%. At an analyst meeting in New York the same day, Johnson said, "I'm completely convinced that our transformation is on track." J. C. Penney's stock rose 5.9% on Johnson's comments at the analyst meeting, the largest single-day stock increase since late January 2012. In 2012, fourth quarter sales for J. C. Penney were poor. Sales were down 28.4% from a year earlier and same store sales were down 32%. Strategic choices made by Johnson a year earlier, including the change in pricing strategy, were being called into question. It was announced in April 2012 that Nickelson Wooster would become the creative director for J. C. Penney menswear. Wooster stated in an interview with Esquire that his influence on the brand would begin with spring menswear available as of February 2013.

On April 8, 2013, Johnson was fired from J. C. Penney after 17 months with the company. Mike Ullman, the retailer's former CEO, was announced as his replacement shortly afterwards. In August, William A. Ackman, of Pershing Square Capital Management, continued his efforts to remove Thomas Engibous, the company's chairman of the board of directors. However, Ackman resigned from the board on August 12, and two new directors were subsequently appointed to the board, one of whom is former Macy's vice chairman Ronald Tysoe. On September 26, 2013, J. C. Penney, with Goldman Sachs as the sole underwriter, announced plans to issue 84 million shares of its stock. The move stood in contrast with CEO Mike Ullman's remarks from earlier that day, whereby he did not foresee "conditions for the rest of the year that would warrant raising liquidity".

During the spring of 2013, a kettle sold by the company attracted controversy when many users of social media pointed out its resemblance to Adolf Hitler, with the kettle being dubbed the Hitler teapot.

During a November 2013 conference call to Wall Street analysts, Ullman announced that J. C. Penney is "restoring initial markups necessary to support the return [to a] promotional department store strategy" with "gross margins, currently 29.5 percent of sales versus 32.5 percent a year ago, were lower due to the impact of clearance sales to eliminate inventory overhang and to transition back to the promotional pricing strategy the company is known for." Ullman is removing the radio frequency identification technology and returning to security tags because shrinkage has "added 100 basis points on margins in the third quarter". Various analysts have mixed reviews of J. C. Penney's future. On December 1, 2013, J. C. Penney was replaced by Allegion in the S&P 500 Index. S&P cited J. C. Penney's 37% fall in market value to $2.7 billion (equivalent to $ in ) was "more representative of the mid-cap market". J. C. Penney replaced Aéropostale from the S&P MidCap 400 Index. In 2013, Soros Fund Management sold over 19 million J. C. Penney shares after only owning them for a few months.

On January 15, 2014, J. C. Penney announced it was closing 33 under-performing stores and laying off 2,000 employees. J. C. Penney's stock continued its decline until their first quarter results in 2014 showed signs of improvement, and sent the share value back into the double digits. In October, it was announced that the company would be tapping former Home Depot executive Marvin Ellison to take on the role of CEO starting in November.

2015–2019
In January 2015, it was announced that J. C. Penney would close 39 under-performing stores nationwide and lay off 2,250 employees. That same year, the company announced that it was liquidating its The Foundry Big & Tall Supply Co. chain of standalone clothing stores. In January 2016, J. C. Penney announced plans to relaunch its business of selling major appliances to target a wave of millennials who are buying first-time homes. In February, J. C. Penney opened a support center in Bangalore, India.

In January 2017, J. C. Penney sold its headquarters campus and surrounding land in Plano, Texas to Dreien Opportunity Partners as a leaseback sale to maintain operations at the location. The land has since been broken up and sold/developed. Space inside the HQ building has been subleased. Part of this land was sold to where the current Toyota North America HQ is now located. In February, J. C. Penney announced that it would shutter two distribution centers and up to 140 under-performing stores as it wrestled with disappointing sales. The company also planned to offer buyouts to roughly 6,000 employees. On March 17, J. C. Penney released a list of 138 locations that would close by the end of June. By closing stores and distribution facilities, J. C. Penney would redirect resources to help expand its store-in-store Sephora boutiques, and add Nike and Adidas boutiques, similar to what Macy's has done with Finish Line, Lids and LensCrafters.

In an effort to capitalize on self-deprecating humor and improve its reputation, J. C. Penney collaborated with Nicole Richie and other designers to open a "Jacques Penne" pop-up shop in Manhattan during the 2017 holiday season.

In 2018, J. C. Penney closed permanently at Plaza Palma Real in Humacao, Puerto Rico, after Hurricane Maria devastated the store in September 2017. In May, J. C. Penney reported an adjusted loss of $69 million in the first quarter, even worse than Wall Street predicted, and lowered its projections for the year. Sales fell 4%, also missing estimates. Earlier in 2018, the company announced it would cut 360 jobs at its stores and corporate headquarters. The company lowered its earnings forecast for the year to 13 cents per share at best, and said it could lose as much as 7 cents. J. C. Penney finished the quarter with just $181 million in cash, down from $363 million a year ago. Much of the big decrease was because of a $190 billion debt replace. On May 22, J. C. Penney announced the resignation of their CEO, Marvin Ellison. On October 2, J. C. Penney announced former Jo-Ann Stores CEO Jill Soltau as their CEO, effective October 15. With the announcement, JCPenney's shares rose 9%. The company ranked 235 on the Fortune 500 list of the largest United States corporations by revenue. She has also brought new talent and has cleaned out inventory. On December 26, the stock price of J. C. Penney (NYSE: JCP) fell below $1 per share. This was the first time shares fell below $1 ever in the 110-year history of the company, which started trading on the New York Stock Exchange in 1929. The stock fell 68% over the course of 2018, including a 30% drop in December 2018 alone.

On February 6, 2019, J. C. Penney said it would stop selling major appliances on February 28, and that furniture would be limited to online and stores in Puerto Rico. On February 28, J. C. Penney announced its intent to close 27 stores in 2019, including 18 full-line department stores and nine home-and-furniture stores. The closure announcement was paired with news that the retailer had suffered a 4% decline in same-store sales during the 2018 holiday quarter. On March 26, J. C. Penney announced the hiring of Bill Wofford as chief financial officer. Wofford came to the company from The Vitamin Shoppe, where he had served as CFO since June 2018. On May 21, J. C. Penney announced that Shawn Gensch will be the Chief Customer Officer to take effect on June 3. Gensch comes from Sprouts Farmers Market where he was their CCO. Also on May 21, J. C. Penney announced a net sales decline of 5.6% and a net loss of $154 million for its fiscal first quarter of 2019, which ended on May 5.

2020
On January 19, 2020, J. C. Penney announced plans to close six stores.

COVID-19 pandemic
On March 15, 2020 when businesses were ordered to temporarily close in many States, the chain closed all of its stores and furloughed its employees. J. C. Penney became the fourth major national retailer to file for bankruptcy in May 2020. Days earlier, it was reported in a regulatory filing that J. C. Penney would give bonuses totaling nearly $10 million to the company's senior managers, which included $4.5 million to CEO Jill Soltau. After 91 years, it was delisted from the New York Stock Exchange on May 18, 2020, and became listed in OTC Pink.

On March 18, J. C. Penney announced all retail stores would temporarily close in response to the global COVID-19 pandemic until April 2. On March 31, J. C. Penney announced an extension of the planned April 2 reopening, with a new date not possible to be determined at the time. On May 1, J. C. Penney announced a limited number of stores would reopen.

Bankruptcy and new ownership
On May 15, 2020, J. C. Penney filed for Chapter 11 bankruptcy and announced that there would be an additional 242 store closings, blaming the COVID-19 pandemic for its action. By June 17, J. C. Penney reopened approximately 827 stores; most of the 154 scheduled for permanent closure in 2020 were among those reopened, with final closing sales in progress. On June 22, J. C. Penney identified an additional 13 stores that would be permanently closed. On July 7, 2020, J. C. Penney announced that they would close two stores in New York City; one at the Manhattan Mall, which was closed immediately and the Kings Plaza store in Brooklyn, which closed on Sunday, September 27, 2020. On December 17, 2020, JCPenney announced that they would close 15 additional stores in March 2021. As of June 2021, there have been a total of 175 store closures. On December 30, 2020, it was announced that Jill Soltau would step down as CEO of JCPenney, effective December 31, 2020. It is unclear whether she was fired or resigned. On January 1, 2021, Soltau was replaced by Simon Property's chief investment officer, Stanley Shashoua.

On June 4, 2020, J. C. Penney released a list of 148 stores slated to close starting in late June 2020, with eleven additional store closures announced on June 22 and two additional stores on July 7, with the previously announced store closing locations remaining on hold pending further review, for a planned closing a total of 242 stores. Since the initial filing, rumors of potential buyers included Amazon, Sycamore Partners, and a group consisting of Authentic Brands (Forever 21, Aeropostale, Barneys), and mall owners Simon Property Group and Brookfield Properties. On July 8, J. C. Penney submitted their bankruptcy exit plan to existing lenders, and also requested more time for negotiations. On July 31, 2020, it was announced that 21 stores, including the "Mother Store" in Kemmerer, Wyoming, would be auctioned off as part of the proceedings.

On September 9, 2020, Brookfield Property Partners and Simon Property Group agreed to purchase JCPenney for about $800 million, including $300 million in cash and assuming $500 million of debt, which was later approved by the court on November 10, 2020. It had been established that once the company emerges from bankruptcy it is poised to save nearly 60,000 jobs, according to various independent studies. The company was paying $2.45 million in monthly rent at the time it sold its headquarters offices in Plano, Texas in 2017; the location was permanently vacated in November 2020, and as of August 2021, no new headquarters location has been announced.

Under Simon and Brookfield 
In October 2021 the company opened 10 new shop-in-shop locations across the US, featuring a wide variety of brands, including indie and BIPOC brands, including flagship partner Thirteen Lune. Marc Rosen became CEO in 2021.

In April 2022, JCPenney's owners–Simon and Brookfield– offered $8.6 billion to purchase Kohl's. Sephora had already announced plans to contract exclusively with Kohl's by 2023, and had piloted Sephora Inside Kohls at select store locations. With this deal, Sephora will remain affiliated with, and under control of, the Simon and Brookfield retail portfolio, therefore superseding and annulling previous agreements for Sephora to leave JCPenney in favor of Kohls.

Finances

Corporate identity
In June 2008, an ad called "Speed Dressing" emerged ending with the J. C. Penney logo and slogan "Every Day Matters". The ad won a prize at the Cannes Lions International Advertising Festival. The ad was criticized for seeming to promote teen sex. J. C. Penney denied that the ad was theirs and their advertising agency Saatchi & Saatchi reported that it had been created by a third-party vendor. It was entered in the competition by Epoch Films, who declined to comment.
Marketing expert John Tantillo advised that the company distance itself from the commercial and also shed the publicity it engendered.

Logo

Private brands
Beginning with the Marathon Hats line, JCPenney has introduced multiple private brands, partially in response to suppliers denying access to expected inventories.

 St. John's Bay, casual clothing and shoes for men and women, including Big & Tall (men) and Plus (women)
 St. John's Bay Outdoor, men's outdoor apparel
 The Original Arizona Jean Company, casual clothing and sandals for men, women, and children, including Big & Tall
 Xersion, active and athletic clothing for men, women and children
 Worthington, women's formal and casual clothing and shoes
 a.n.a, young women's urban clothing and shoes
 Ambrielle, women's sleepwear, intimates, and swim
 Liz Claiborne, women's apparel
 Ryegrass, stylish women's fashion
 Stafford, men's tailored/fitted clothing and shoes
 J. Ferrar, men's full line of slim-fitting clothing,including Big & Tall
 Collection by Michael Strahan, men's suits, ties, and cuff links
 Claiborne (discontinued), men's apparel
 Mutual Weave, men's denim and casual outerwear
 Marilyn Monroe, women's vintage collection
 Foundry Supply Co. (discontinued solo stores, brand moved to JCPenney stores), men's Big & Tall apparel, superseded by SJB and Arizona.
 ThereAbouts, casual wear for boys and girls
 Okie Dokie, newborn and toddler apparel
 JCPenney Home, home goods
 Linden Street, bedding
 Cooks, cookware
 Home Expressions, home goods
 North Pole Trading Co, Christmas decor & bedding
 Marathon Hats (the first JCP private brand)
 Loom + Forge, modern home decor, bedding, and window

Former subsidiaries
Eckerd Pharmacy – A chain of pharmacies that JCPenney sold off in 2004, with former locations becoming CVS or Rite Aid.
The Treasury / Treasury Island – a chain of discount stores that JCPenney closed in the 80s
Treasury drug stores – A chain of stand alone drug stores that were also branded with the Treasury nameplate. Treasury Drug stores became Eckerd which JCPenney also owned.
JCPenney Insurance – JCPenney Casualty Insurance (also referred to as Penney-Wise Protection) was sold to Metropolitan Life Insurance Company in 1989.
Auto Centers – JCPenney had Auto Centers during the 70s and 80s. Some JCPenney Auto Centers had gas stations. JCPenney closed the auto centers by the 90s.
JCPenney Home Stores – stores that sold linens & home decor
JCPenney Outlet / JC's 5 Star Outlet – JCPenney Outlet Stores were stores that sold JCPenney's merchandise at a lower outlet store price. JC's 5 star outlet was a "lower rank" outlet store. All of the outlet stores were closed by 2011.
JCPenney furniture outlet – JCPenney outlet stores that only sold furniture & rugs.
JCPenney Restaurants – Some stores had JCPenney branded restaurants
Penncraft Tools – A short-lived line of tools intended to compete with Sears Craftsman, with hand tools manufactured by New Britain and power tools and drill bits manufactured by Stanley.

Locations listed on the National Register of Historic Places
JCPenney locations that are listed on the National Register of Historic Places (NRHP):

J. C. Penney-Chicago Store (Tucson, Arizona)
J. C. Penney Company Building (Shoshone, Idaho)
J. C. Penney Co. Warehouse Building (St. Louis, Missouri)
J. C. Penney Building (Newberg, Oregon)
J. C. Penney Historic District, Kemmerer, Wyoming, a National Historic Landmark District
J. C. Penney House, Kemmerer, Wyoming

See also
 Retail apocalypse

References

External links

 
1902 establishments in Wyoming
American companies established in 1902
Companies formerly listed on the New York Stock Exchange
Companies that filed for Chapter 11 bankruptcy in 2020
Department stores of the United States
Furniture retailers of the United States
Companies based in Plano, Texas
Online retailers of the United States
Retail companies established in 1902
Authentic Brands Group
2020 mergers and acquisitions
Simon Property Group
Brookfield Asset Management